Monocanock Island is a river island in Luzerne County, Pennsylvania. It is located roughly 100 meters downriver from the George Dennis Memorial Bridge, which connects Jenkins Twp. and Wyoming Borough across the Susquehanna River.

Monocanock is a name derived from the Algonquian language purported to mean "island place".

References

Landforms of Luzerne County, Pennsylvania
River islands of Pennsylvania